Uli (also Romanized as Uli and Evlī; also known as  Owlá and Owlá Kandī) is a village in Esperan Rural District, in the Central District of Tabriz County, East Azerbaijan Province, Iran. At the 2006 census, its population was 778, in 197 families.

References 

Populated places in Tabriz County